Bike to Work Day is an annual event that promotes the bicycle as an option for commuting to work (bicycle commuting). It is held in the Spring in a variety of locations including the United States, Canada, Europe and Asia.

Bike Week is the week that includes the Bike-to-Work Day, in May, and the World Bicycle Day, on June 3.

Origins

Bike to Work Day was originated by the League of American Bicyclists in 1956 and is a part of Bike-to-Work Week, which is in turn part of National Bike Month.

Activities

Leading up to Bike to Work Day, national, regional, and local bicycle advocacy groups encourage people to try bicycle commuting as a healthy and safe alternative to driving by providing route information and tips for new bicycle commuters. Further, the American Medical Association has endorsed Bike to Work Day as part of its push to encourage active transportation. The event is supported by many organizations, from local bike shops and restaurants to municipalities and transit authorities. The southern California commuter rail network Metrolink offers free rides to cyclists on Bike to Work day.

On Bike to Work Day, a wide variety of bicycle-related events are organized. The day is a major event in the San Francisco Bay Area, where thousands of residents participate annually, supported by corporate sponsors. Organized "Commuter Convoys," and "Energizer Stations" set up in various locations around the Bay Area providing free food and coffee to bike commuters by organizations such as the San Francisco Bicycle Coalition, East Bay Bicycle Coalition, and Silicon Valley Bicycle Coalition.  Members of the San Francisco Board of Supervisors and the Mayor of San Francisco regularly participate, commuting by bicycle to City Hall.

Bike to Work Day also enjoys broad participation throughout the country. Eleven businesses in Boulder, Colorado gave free breakfast to 1,200 participants in 2012 and 1,600 participants in 2013.  Bethesda, Maryland used the event to unveil new bike racks (increasing from 200 to 300) and had speeches on transportation. In Kitchener, Ontario, a local bike club, Ziggy's, donated twelve commuter bikes to people who participated and blogged about the event in 2012.  Chicago, Illinois gave free tune-ups and balaclavas to participants.

See also
Bay Area Bike to Work Day
Bike to Work Week Victoria
Bike Week (Bicycle Week)
World Bicycle Day

References

External links
 UK Cycle to Work Day
Bike to Work Czech campaign 
b2w-indonesia.or.id Indonesian bike to work community
Bike to Work Month Boulder Colorado
Bike to Work Day (Rome)
Bike to Work Day (Washington DC)
League of American Bicyclists: Bike Month
PSA Bike to Work Video

May observances
Utility cycling
Cycling events in the United States
Cycling events in Canada